Allah Rakha may refer to:
 Alla Rakha, tabla player from India
 Allah Rakha (sarangi), sarangi player from Pakistan
 A. R. Rahman, Indian film music composer
 Allah Rakha (film), a 1986 Bollywood film